Daisy Speranza was a French tennis player who won the French Championship in doubles and mixed doubles.

Doubles
Speranza won the French Championship in doubles with Jeanne Matthey each year from 1909 to 1912

Mixed doubles
Speranza won the French Championship in mixed doubles with William Laurentz twice.

References

French female tennis players
Year of birth missing
Year of death missing